This is a list of notable people affiliated with Lafayette College.

Notable alumni and trustees

Academics and education
 George C. Heckman, class of 1845, president of Hanover College 1870–79
 Thomas Craig, class of 1875, early professor of mathematics at Johns Hopkins University
 James Bright, class of 1877, philologist, first person to receive a Ph.D. in English from Johns Hopkins
 James Cameron Mackenzie, class of 1878, educator
 James McKeen Cattell, class of 1880, the first professor of psychology in the United States
 Robert L. Slagle, class of 1887, President South Dakota Agricultural College 1906–14; University of South Dakota 1914-28
 Earl Gregg Swem, class of 1893, historian, bibliographer and librarian
 Joseph S. Illick, class of 1907, Dean of the New York State College of Forestry, 1944–51
 Ralph Cooper Hutchison, class of 1918, president of Washington & Jefferson College, 1931–45, and Lafayette College, 1945–57
 Frank Reed Horton, class of 1926, founder of the Alpha Phi Omega fraternity
 Frank Franz, class of 1959, provost at West Virginia University and fourth president of The University of Alabama in Huntsville
 Nils Yngve Wessell, class of 1934, president of Tufts University, 1953–66
 Leonard Jeffries, class of 1959, Professor of Black Studies at the City College of New York (City)
 Martin Jezer, class of 1961, progressive activist in New York and Vermont; leader of stutterers' self-help movement
 Barry Wellman, class of 1963, Professor of Sociology,. University of Toronto, 1967–2013; Co-director, NetLab Network
 Joseph Rallo, class of 1971, Commissioner of Higher Education for the State of Louisiana.
 Darlyne Bailey, class of 1974, first African American dean of the College of Education and Human Development at the University of Minnesota
 John Anderson Fry, class of 1982, former president of Franklin & Marshall College and current president of Drexel University

Business
 Ario Pardee, trustee from 1865 to 1892, president of the trustees from 1881 to 1892. Coal magnate and philanthropist who donated the funds to create the engineering and science departments at Lafayette, namesake of Pardee Hall which he also funded
 James Gayley, class of 1876, Managing Director Carnegie Steel Company and first vice president of U.S. Steel, 1901–09
 Torrence Huffman, class of 1878, Banker; loaned the Huffman Prairie to the Wright Brothers
 Charles Bergstresser, class of 1881, one of the three founders of Dow Jones & Company
 Harrison Woodhull Crosby, commercialized the canned tomato
 Leslie Freeman Gates, class of 1897, president of the Chicago Board of Trade, 1919–20
 George B. Walbridge, class of 1898, co-founder and chairman of Walbridge Aldinger (now known as simply Walbridge)
 T. Frank Soles, class of 1904, chairman of the board of Talon, Inc., zipper manufacturer; trustee and donor of Soles Hall
 Fred Morgan Kirby, trustee from 1916 to 1940, helped found the Woolworth's five and dime store chain
 Thomas J. Watson, trustee;  donor; first chairman and CEO of IBM, 1914–56; computing pioneer; namesake of the Watson Computer
 Edward Jesser, class of 1939, former president of the New Jersey Chamber of Commerce & New Jersey Bankers Association, chairman and CEO of Summit Bancorp
 Walter E. Hanson, class of 1949, chairman of KPMG.
 Sarkis Acopian, class of 1951, founded Acopian Technical Company, makers of the first solar radios.
 Arthur J. Rothkopf, class of 1955, retired senior vice president of U.S. Chamber of Commerce; president emeritus of Lafayette College
 Michael H. Moskow, class of 1959, CEO and president of the Federal Reserve Bank of Chicago
 Stephen D. Pryor, class of 1971, president of ExxonMobil Chemical Company
 Neil Levin, class of 1976, former executive director of the Port Authority of New York and New Jersey, vice president of Goldman Sachs
 Chip Bergh, Class of 1979, CEO of Levi Strauss & Co.
 Angel L. Mendez, class of 1982, COO of HERE
 Fran Horowitz, class of 1985, president & chief merchandising officer of Abercrombie & Fitch Co.
 Alan Hoffman, class of 1988, senior vice president, PepsiCo.; former deputy chief of staff to Vice President Joe Biden; Deputy Assistant to the U.S. President
 Hendrik J. Hartong III, class of 1989, CEO of Brynwood Partners
 William R. Wagner, class of 1989, CEO of LogMeIn
 Stephen Messer, class of 1993, founder of Rakuten Linkshare and angel investor
Ian Murray, class of 1997, cofounder of Vineyard Vines
 Carson Conant, class of 1998, founder and CEO of Mediafly

Engineering
 William Ashburner Cattell, class of 1884, civil engineer and railroad company president
 James Madison Porter III, class of 1886, professor of civil engineering and designer of Northampton Street Bridge
 William F. Durand, class of 1888, mechanical engineer and first civilian chair of the National Advisory Committee for Aeronautics
 Edgar Jadwin, class of 1888, General, Chief of Engineers
 Don Lancaster, class of 1961, author, inventor, and microcomputer pioneer

Entertainment
 Burr McIntosh, class of 1884, actor, author, and photographer.
 Joel Silver, head of Hollywood's Silver Pictures and producer of films including the Die Hard, Lethal Weapon, and The Matrix series
 Lorene Scafaria, screenwriter, playwright, actress and singer best known for her work on the 2008 film Nick and Norah's Infinite Playlist
 Jim Rosenhaus, class of 1986, broadcaster for the Cleveland Indians
 Beth Mowins, class of 1989, ESPN announcer and one of the first women color analysts on the network

Government
 Charles F. Chidsey, class of 1864, first mayor of Easton, member of the Pennsylvania House of Representatives.
 Isaiah D. Clawson, class of 1833, represented New Jersey's 1st congressional district in the United States House of Representatives, 1855-59
 James Morrison Harris, class of 1833, U.S. Representative from Maryland, 1855–1861; Lafayette College trustee, 1865–72
 Alexander Ramsey, class of 1836, Governor of Minnesota, US Senator, Congressman, Secretary of War
 Nathaniel B. Smithers, class of 1836, U.S. Representative from Delaware, 1863–65
 Philip Johnson, class of 1844, U.S. Representative from Pennsylvania, 1861–63, 1863–67
 Henry Clay Longnecker, class of 1845 (non-graduate), honorary degree in 1851, U.S. Representative from Pennsylvania 1859-61
 Henry Green, class of 1846, Chief Justice, Supreme Court of Pennsylvania
 Henry Martyn Hoyt, attended 1845–48, honorary law degree conferred in 1882, Governor of Pennsylvania, 1879–83
 Horatio Gates Fisher, class of 1855, US Representative from Pennsylvania, 1879–83
 Samuel McLean, non-graduate, received honorary degree in 1857, member of first Montana State Legislature, 1865–67
 Benjamin Franklin Junkin, entered 1837, A.M. in 1865, US Representative from Pennsylvania, 1859–1861
 Robert Porter Allen, class of 1855, Pennsylvania State Senator, 1875–78
 Allen Craig, class of 1855, Pennsylvania State Representative and Senator, 1865–67, 1879–82
 John W. Griggs, class of 1868, Governor of New Jersey, 1896–1898; US Attorney General, 1898–1901
 Frank J. Washabaugh, class of 1870, South Dakota jurist and legislator
 Laird Howard Barber, class of 1871, US Representative from Pennsylvania 1899–1901, lawyer
 Arthur Granville Dewalt, class of 1874, US Representative from Pennsylvania, 1915–21
 Isaac Barber, class of 1876, New Jersey State Senator 1896–99, 1902–05
 Russell Benjamin Harrison, class of 1877, Indiana legislator; consul to Portugal and Mexico; son of U.S. President Benjamin Harrison
Edward Francis Blewitt, class of 1879, Pennsylvania State Senator, 1907–1910; great-grandfather to Joe Biden
 George Howell, class of 1880, US Representative from Pennsylvania, 1903–1904
 John R. Farr, class of 1885, U.S. Representative from Pennsylvania, 1911–19, and 1921
 Cyrus E. Woods, class  of 1886, president pro tempore Pennsylvania State Senate 1901–07; U.S. Ambassador to Spain and Japan, 1921–24
 Wallace McCamant, class of 1888, Judge, U.S. Court of Appeals for the Ninth Circuit, 1925–26
 Harry Arista Mackey, class of 1890, Mayor of Philadelphia 1928 - 31
 Frederic Antes Godcharles, class of 1893, Pennsylvania State Representative and Senator, 1900–08
 Isaac Clinton Kline, class of 1893, U.S. Representative from Pennsylvania from 1921 to 1923, lawyer
 A. Mitchell Palmer, attended briefly and honorary degree conferred in 1919, 50th Attorney General of the United States, overseer of the Palmer Raids
 John D. Clarke, class of 1898, U.S. Congressman from New York
 William Huntington Kirkpatrick, class of 1905, U.S. Representative from Pennsylvania 1921-23
 Joseph F. Crater, class of 1910, Associate Justice of the New York Supreme Court
 Haydn Proctor, class of 1926, Associate Justice of the Supreme Court of New Jersey
 Wesley Lance, class of 1928, member of New Jersey General Assembly and New Jersey Senate; one of the drafters of the current, 1947 New Jersey State Constitution
 Robert B. Meyner, class of 1930, Governor of New Jersey 1954–62; competed against John F. Kennedy in the 1960 Democratic Party primary
 Winston L. Prouty, class of 1930, United States Representative and Senator from Vermont
 William H. Woodin, Trustee, U.S. Secretary of the Treasury, 1933
 Wayne Dumont, class of 1935, former Acting Governor of New Jersey
 Wendell Good, class of 1935, Pennsylvania State Representative 1967-72
 Charles Timothy Slack, class of 1935, Pennsylvania State Representative 1961-70
 Arch A. Moore, Jr., attended in 1943, twice Governor of West Virginia
 Arthur Sohmer, class of 1948, Chief of Staff to former Vice President Spiro Agnew
 D. Bennett Mazur (c. 1925–1994), member of the New Jersey General Assembly
 Fred Ashton, class of 1952, Mayor of Easton from 1967 to 1975.
 Dennis Kux, class of 1952, U.S. Ambassador to Côte d'Ivoire, 1986–89
 William E. Simon, class of 1952, 63rd Secretary of the Treasury, president of the United States Olympic Committee
 Bob Smith, class of 1952, former Senator of New Hampshire
 Garrett E. Brown, Jr., class of 1965, Chief Judge of the United States District Court for the District of New Jersey
 George F. Pott, Jr., class of 1965, Pennsylvania State Representative 1977-86
 Robert Pastor, class of 1969, former member of the United States National Security Council
 Joel A. Pisano, class of 1971, Federal Judge for District Court of New Jersey
 Marcia Bernicat, class of 1975, United States Ambassador to Bangladesh
 Robin L. Wiessmann, class of 1975, former Pennsylvania State Treasurer
 Craig Dally, class of 1978, Pennsylvania State Representative, 1997–2010
 Bruce L. Castor, Jr., class of 1983, Attorney General (interim) and first Solicitor General of Pennsylvania, former district attorney and county commissioner in Montgomery County, Pennsylvania; Presidential Impeachment Counsel; Lawyer.
 Doug Reichley, class of 1983, Pennsylvania State Representative 2003-12
 Robert Spagnoletti, class of 1984, former Attorney General of the District of Columbia
 Michael A. Raynor, class of 1984, former United States Ambassador to Benin
 Anthony Palumbo, class of 1994, member New York State Assembly, 2013–present
 Aaron Kaufer, class of 2011, Pennsylvania State Representative, 2015–present
 Travis Hutson, class of 2007, Florida State Senator 2012-present

Arts, Humanities, and Social Sciences
 Snowden Ashford, class of 1888, Washington D.C.'s first municipal architect
 Edwin Atlee Barber, classes of 1887 and 1893, Director Pennsylvania Museum and School of Industrial Art
 Harold H. Bender, class of 1903, professor of philology at Princeton University
 Brent Glass, class of 1969, director of Smithsonian National Museum of American History
 Jules Prown, class of 1951, professor of art history at Yale University
 Frederick Starr, class of 1882, anthropologist
 J. Elfreth Watkins Sr., class of 1874, Curator United States National Museum
 Barry Wellman, class of 1963, sociologist; founder of International Network for Social Network Analysis

Literature and poetry
 John Martin Crawford, class of 1871, translated the Finnish epic Kalevala into English; Consul-general of the United States to Russia under President Benjamin Harrison
 Stephen Crane, author of The Red Badge of Courage; attended for one semester before leaving to focus exclusively on his writing
 Dominique Lapierre, class of 1952, author
 Martin Jezer, class of 1961, activist and author
 Jay Parini, class of 1970, poet and Middlebury College professor
 Ross Gay, class of 1996, poet
 M. K. Asante, Jr., class of 2004, professor, author, and filmmaker
 Michael S. Schmidt, class of 2005,  author and two-time Pulitzer Prize-winning Washington correspondent for The New York Times

Medicine
 Philip S. Hench, class of 1916, winner of Nobel Prize in Physiology or Medicine in 1950
 Haldan K. Hartline, class of 1923, winner of Nobel Prize in Physiology or Medicine in 1967
 Orvan Hess, class of 1927, physician noted for his early use of penicillin and development of the fetal heart monitor
 C. Harmon Brown, class of 1952, pioneer in women's sports medicine; Olympic track and field coach

Military
 Andrew Porter, class of 1838 (non-graduate), honorary degree in 1865, Brigadier General U.S. Army
 Theophilus Francis Rodenbough, class of 1854 (non-graduate), Brigadier General U.S. Army; Medal of Honor recipient
 Charles A. Wikoff, class of 1855, most senior ranking United States Army officer killed in the Spanish–American War
 Stephen Wilson Pomeroy, class of 1861, "The Unknown Scout" who alerted Governor Curtin of General Lee's amassing army at Gettysburg
 Duncan Stephen Walker, class of 1862 (non-graduate), Brigadier General U.S. Army, great-great-grandson of Benjamin Franklin
 Peyton C. March, class of 1884, Army Chief of Staff during World War I
 General George H. Decker, class of 1924, Chief of Staff of the United States Army, 1960–62
 David Showell, class of 1951, member of the Tuskegee Airmen; a football player while at Lafayette; his exclusion led to the 1949 Sun Bowl controversy

Religion and theology
 William Henry Green, class of 1840, president of The College of New Jersey, professor of Biblical and Oriental Literature in Princeton Theological Seminary
 John Douglas Bemo (Husti-Coluc-Chee, later Tal-a-Mas-Mico), non-graduate 1843–46, nephew of Osceola Chief of the Seminoles; responsible for baptizing over 5,000 Native Americans in the Oklahoma Territory
 W.A.P. Martin, class of 1860, Presbyterian missionary and translator
 James Isaac Good, class of 1872, clergyman
 Kenneth Wapnick, class of 1963, co-founder of A Course in Miracles

Sciences
 James H. Coffin, Lafayette College vice president and treasurer 1846–73, pioneer in meteorology
 William Harkness, attended 1854–56, astronomer
 William McMurtrie, class of 1871 and first Ph.D. in chemistry awarded at Lafayette (1875); Chief Chemist for the United States Department of Agriculture, 1873–78; president of American Chemical Society in 1900
 Maynard Bixby, class of 1876, discoverer of bixbyite and explorer
 Eugene C. Bingham, Chemistry Professor 1916–39, pioneer in rheology; namesake of Bingham plastic, fluid, and stress, and the Bingham Medal
 S. Donald Stookey, class of 1938, inventor of Corningware earned his master's degree in chemistry in the 1930s
 Jay Weiss, class of 1962, professor of psychiatry Emory University School of Medicine, MacArthur Fellow

Sports
 Harry Hempstead, class of 1891, Owner of the New York Giants, National League baseball team.
 George Barclay, class of 1898, inventor of the football helmet, outfielder for the St. Louis Cardinals and the Boston Beaneaters
 Charles Rinehart, class of 1898, College Football Hall of Fame member
 Dick Wright, catcher for the Brooklyn Tip-Tops
 Fritz Scheeren, class of 1914, pitcher for the Pittsburgh Pirates
 Ty Helfrich, class of 1915, second baseman for the Brooklyn Tip-Tops
 Al Bedner, class of 1921, NFL player
 George Seasholtz, class of 1922, NFL player for the Milwaukee Badgers and the Kenosha Maroons
 Frank Schwab, class of 1923, College Football Hall of Fame member
 Al LeConey, class of 1923, 1924 Summer Olympics gold medalist in the 4 × 100 meter relay, later featured on a U.S. postal stamp
 Charlie Berry, Jr., class of 1924, College Football Hall of Fame member; the only man to officiate World Series, NFL Championship, and College All-Star game in the same year; catcher for the Boston Red Sox, Philadelphia Athletics, Chicago White Sox; NFL leading scorer in 1925 for the Pottsville Maroons
 Joe Marhefka, class of 1924, NFL player for Pottsville Maroons
 Matt Brennan, class of 1925, NFL player
 Frank Grube, class of 1926, catcher for the White Sox and St. Louis Browns
 Frank Kirkleski, class of 1927, NFL player for the Pottsville Maroons
 George Wilson, class of 1929, College Football Hall of Fame member and previous NCAA scoring record holder
 Adam J. Cirillo, class of 1933, head football coach of Brooklyn Technical High School, won 10 New York City Public School Athletic League championships
 Frank Hiller, class of 1942, pitcher for the New York Yankees, Chicago Cubs, Cincinnati Reds
 Pete Carril, class of 1951, former Princeton University men's basketball head coach and Sacramento Kings assistant coach
 Alexander K. 'Whip' Buck, class of 1952, co-owner of the Philadelphia Phillies from 1981 until his death in 2010
 Pete Carril, Class of 1952, head coach of Princeton University; enshrined in both the National Collegiate Basketball Hall of Fame and the Naismith Basketball Hall of Fame
 Tracy Tripucka, class of 1972, three-time men's basketball All-American, New York Knicks draft selection, collegiate assistant coach
 Peter Simon, class of 1975, co-owner of the NHL's New Jersey Devils, name inscribed on the Stanley Cup
 Joe Maddon, class of 1976, two-time World Series Champion (2002, 2016); former manager of Major League Baseball's Anaheim Angels, Chicago Cubs, and Tampa Bay Rays. 
 George Tiger, class of 1981, midfielder for Pittsburgh Spirit, 1984–1985
 Jeff Mutis, class of 1988, first-round draft pick in the 1988 Major League Baseball Draft by the Cleveland Indians; played for the Florida Marlins, pitcher
 Blake Costanzo, class of 2006, linebacker and special teams specialist for the NFL's Chicago Bears and formerly the San Francisco 49ers, Cleveland Browns, and Buffalo Bills
 David Bednar, class of 2017, pitcher for the Pittsburgh Pirates and formerly San Diego Padres; named an All-Star in 2022
 Walt Zirinsky, American football player

Notable faculty
  Jacob E. Cooke, Henry McCracken Professor of History, 1962–90, and editor of The Federalist
 Guy Consolmagno, assistant professor, physics and astronomy
 Tom Davis, college men's basketball coach, 1971–77
 Clement Eaton, chair of history department, 1931–42
 Terry Jonathan Hart, visiting lecturer of engineering
 George Junkin, first president of Lafayette College
 Chawne Kimber, mathematician and quilter
 John Kincaid, Robert B. & Helen S. Meyner Professor of Government and Public Service and Director of the Meyner Center for the Study of State and Local Government, 1994–present
 Butch van Breda Kolff, college men's basketball coach, 1952–56
 Francis March, first professor of English Literature at any American college or university
 Herb McCracken, head football coach
 Edward Mylin, head football coach
 Bruce Allen Murphy, Supreme Court Scholar
 Theodore Roethke, poet, served on faculty prior to his publication and fame
 Steve Spagnuolo, football coach, defensive line/special teams 1984–86
 Jock Sutherland, head football coach 1919–23
 Lee Upton, poet, writer in residence, professor of English
 Hal Wissel, college men's basketball coach, 1967–71
 Tim Lenahan,  Men's Soccer Coach, 1998–2001
 Gary Williams, Men's Head Soccer Coach and Assistant Basketball Coach, 1972–77

Presidents of Lafayette College
 George Junkin, 1832–1841, 1844–1848
 John William Yeomans, 1841–1844
 Charles William Nassau, 1849–1850
 Daniel V. McLean, 1850–1857
 George Wilson McPhail, 1857–1863
 William Cassady Cattell, 1863–1883
 James Hall Mason Knox, 1883–1890
 Traill Green, 1890–1891 (acting)
 Ethelbert Dudley Warfield, 1891–1914
 John Henry MacCracken, 1915–1926
 Donald B. Prentice, 1926–1927 (acting)
 William Mather Lewis, 1927–1945
 Ralph Cooper Hutchison, 1945–1957, class of 1918
 Guy Everett Snavely, 1957–1958 (interim)
 K. Roald Bergethon, 1958–1978
 David Ellis, 1978–1990
 Robert I. Rotberg, 1990–1993
 Arthur J. Rothkopf, 1993–2005, class of 1955
 Daniel Weiss, 2005–2013
 Alison Byerly, 2013–2021
 Nicole Hurd, 2021–Present

William Sebring Kirkpatrick served as acting president from 1902 to 1903 during the tenure of Warfield, who remained as president. Warfield had suffered a nervous breakdown before commencement in 1902, and was granted one years absence to recuperate.

References

Lafayette College people